Rotala is a genus of plants in the loosestrife family. Several species are used as aquarium plants.

Species include:
Rotala andamanensis
Rotala densiflora
Rotala hippuris
Rotala indica
Rotala malabarica
Rotala malampuzhensis
Rotala ramosior
Rotala rotundifolia
Rotala kanayensis Rijuraj et al.
Rotala wallichii "Whorly Rotala"

External links
Flora of China

 
Lythraceae genera